James L. Woodruff (March 17, 1905 – November 21, 2007) was an American football player. He played college football at the University of Pittsburgh and professional football in the National Football League (NFL) as an end for the Chicago Cardinals in 1926 and the Buffalo Bisons in 1929. He appeared in seven NFL games, five as a starter. He scored one touchdown during the 1929 season.

References

1905 births
2007 deaths
American centenarians
Men centenarians
Pittsburgh Panthers football players
Chicago Cardinals players
Buffalo Bisons (NFL) players
Players of American football from Nebraska